Giuseppe Pira (4 January 1932 – 23 April 2008) was an Italian coxswain. He competed in the men's eight event at the 1960 Summer Olympics.

References

External links
 

1932 births
2008 deaths
Italian male rowers
Olympic rowers of Italy
Rowers at the 1960 Summer Olympics
Coxswains (rowing)